The Pakistan national cricket team toured India in the 1986-87 season to play five Test matches and six One Day International matches.  They also played three first-class matches.

Pakistan won the Test series 1-0 after they were victorious by 16 runs in the final match of the series, the previous four games having been drawn.

Pakistan were captained by Imran Khan who was voted "Man of the Series". It was last test series of Indian opener Sunil Gavaskar.

Test matches

1st Test

2nd Test

3rd Test

4th Test

5th Test

One Day Internationals (ODIs)

Pakistan won the Charminar Challenge Cup 5-1.

1st ODI

2nd ODI

3rd ODI

4th ODI

5th ODI

6th ODI

External sources
 Cricarchive
 Tour page CricInfo
 Record CricInfo

References

Sources
 Playfair Cricket Annual
 Wisden Cricketers' Almanack

External links
 

1987 in cricket
1987 in Pakistani cricket
1987 in Indian cricket
1986-87
Indian cricket seasons from 1970–71 to 1999–2000
International cricket competitions from 1985–86 to 1988